Highway 27 is a provincial highway in the Canadian province of Saskatchewan.

History
The present-day Highway 27 is part of the original Provincial Highway 5 alignment, a trans-provincial highway that travelled from Manitoba to Alberta and crossed the South Saskatchewan River via ferry, while Provincial Highway 27 connected Aberdeen with Saskatoon. In the late 1940s, the highway 5 and 27 designations were switched so that Provincial Highway 5 passed through Saskatoon.

Major intersections
From west to east:

References

027